According to the political theorist Alan Johnson, there has been a revival of serious interest in communism in the 21st century led by Slavoj Žižek and Alain Badiou. Other leading theorists are Michael Hardt, Antonio Negri, Gianni Vattimo, Alessandro Russo, Judith Balso, Jodi Dean, Michael Lebowitz, and Paul Cockshott as well as Alberto Toscano, translator of Alain Badiou, Terry Eagleton, Eduard Limonov, Bruno Bosteels and Peter Hallward. In 2009, many of these advocates contributed to the three-day conference, "The Idea of Communism", in London that drew a substantial paying audience.


Theory and works 
Theoretical publications, some published by Verso Books, include The Idea of Communism, edited by Costas Douzinas and Žižek; Badiou's The Communist Hypothesis; and Bosteels's The Actuality of Communism. The defining common ground is the contention that "the crises of contemporary liberal capitalist societies—ecological degradation, financial turmoil, the loss of trust in the political class, exploding inequality—are systemic; interlinked, not amenable to legislative reform, and requiring 'revolutionary' solutions".

In the introduction to The Idea of Communism (2009), Žižek and Douzinas also identified four common premises among the thinkers in attendance:
 The idea of communism confronts depoliticization through a return to voluntarism.
 Communism as a radical philosophical idea. It must be thought of as taking distance from economism and statism as well as learning from the experiences of the 21st century.
 Communism combats neoliberalism by returning to the idea of the "common".
 Communism as freedom and equality. Equality cannot exist without freedom and vice versa.

A rise in Marxist thought followed the financial crisis of 2007–2008, with the publishing of books including G. A. Cohen's Why Not Socialism? (2009), Paul Paolucci's Marx's Scientific Dialectics (2009), Alain Badiou's The Communist Hypothesis (2010), Kieran Allen's Marx and the Alternative to Capitalism (2011), Terry Eagleton's Why Marx Was Right (2011) and Vincent Mosco's Marx is Back (2012).

Non communist contributors 
Other non-communist thinkers and theorists have also had an effect on communist theory and the new generation of communists in the 21st century, such as the economist Guy Standing and the anthropologist and anarchist David Graeber.

See also 

 Hermeneutic Communism

References

Further reading 
 Costas Douzinas, editor and contributor; Slavoj Žižek, editor; Alain Badiou, contributor; Judith Balso, contributor; Bruno Bosteels, contributor; Susan Buck-Morss, contributor; Terry Eagleton, contributor; Peter Hallward, contributor; Michael Hardt, contributor; Jean-Luc Nancy, contributor; Antonio Negri, contributor; Jacques Rancière, contributor; Mark Russo, contributor; Alberto Toscano, contributor; Gianni Vattimo, contributor; The Idea of Communism (Vol. 1), Verso (December 13, 2010), hardcover, 224 pages,  ; trade paperback, Verso (December 13, 2010),  .
 
 
 
  
 Communism, A New Beginning? October 14–16, 2011.
 "Full Communism" blog post at versobooks.com by Huw Lemmey May 3, 2012.

Communist theory
Communists
Writers about communism